Thommie Persson (born 4 August 1984) is a Swedish footballer who played for Malmö FF, Trelleborgs FF and Varbergs BoIS as a defender. He played over 100 games in the Allsvenskan.

References

1984 births
Living people
Association football defenders
Swedish footballers
Allsvenskan players
Superettan players
Malmö FF players
Trelleborgs FF players
Varbergs BoIS players